Kašiković is a Serbian surname.

Notable people with the surname include:

 Nikola T. Kašiković (1861–1927), Serbian writer and educator
 Stoja Kašiković (1865 – after 1927), Serbian feminist, editor and teacher
 Dragiša Kašiković (1932–1977), Serbian writer and journalist

Serbian surnames